Dicyanamide, also known as dicyanamine,  is an anion having the formula . It contains two cyanide groups bound to a central nitrogen anion. The chemical is formed by decomposition of 2-cyanoguanidine. It is used extensively as a counterion of organic and inorganic salts, and also as a reactant for the synthesis of various covalent organic structures.

Dicyanimide was used as an anionic component in an organic superconductor that was, when reported in 1990, a superconductor with the highest transition temperature in its structural class. Dean Kenyon has examined the role of this chemical in reactions that can produce peptides. A co-worker then considered this reactive nature and examined the possible role dicyanamide may have had in primordial biogenesis.

References 

Nitriles
Anions